Jiading is an atonal pinyin romanization of various Chinese names and words.

It may refer to:

 Jiading District, in Shanghai provincial-level city, China.
 Jiading Town, a subdistrict forming the historical core of Jiading District
 Jiading, a former name of Leshan prefecture-level city, in Sichuan province, China
 Roman Catholic Diocese of Jiading
 Jiading, a town in Huzhu Tu Autonomous County, Qinghai province
 Jiading District, a variant pronunciation of Qieding District in Kaohsiung, Taiwan

See also
 Gia Định Province, Vietnam, known as Jiading in Chinese